Heibao is the self-titled debut album by seminal Chinese rock band Black Panther, released August 1991 in Hong Kong on Kinn's Management Ltd. and December 1, 1992 in China and Taiwan on Magic Stone Records.

The album spawned two hits; the opening track "Shameful" became the group's best-known song, while "Don't Break My Heart", topped the Hong Kong charts for three weeks upon its release. Black Panther were soon signed by Taiwanese record label Rock Records, which was then establishing a rock market in China via its mainland subsidiary, Magic Stone. The Magic Stone edition of the record was released in China and Taiwan in December 1992. The album sold 1.5 million copies, making it one of the bestselling Chinese rock albums of all time.

In 1992, lead vocalist Dou Wei left the band to pursue an influential solo career.

Track listing

Personnel 
Personnel from the liner notes listed as follows:

Black Panther 

 Dou Wei - lead vocals
 Li Tong - guitar, backing vocals
 Wang Wenjie - bass, backing vocals
 Zhao Mingyi - drums, backing vocals
 Luan Shu - keyboards, backing vocals

Production 

 Li Zhenquan - production, recording, mixing, mastering, additional arrangements

References 

1992 debut albums
Mandarin-language albums
Black Panther (band) albums